Eucalyptus odorata, commonly known as peppermint box, is a species of mallee or a small tree that is endemic to South Australia. It has rough, hard bark on the trunk and larger branches, smooth greyish bark on the thinner branches, lance-shaped adult leaves, flower buds in groups of between seven and eleven, white flowers and cylindrical or barrel-shaped fruit.

Description
Flowering occurs between March and October and the flowers are white.

Taxonomy and naming
Eucalyptus odorata was first formally described in 1847 by Hans Hermann Behr in the journal Linnaea. The specific epithet (odorata) is from the Latin odoratus meaning "having a smell", referring to the scent of the leaves when crushed.

Distribution
Peppermint box is widely distributed in South Australia, between the southern Flinders Ranges and Bordertown and Lake Alexandrina, and on the lower Eyre Peninsula and Kangaroo Island. It also occurs in north-western Victoria and there are a few records from the Cobar region of New South Wales. It grows in a variety of habitats but most commonly on undulating country.

Gallery

Images from the Forest Flora of New South Wales (1913) by J.H Maiden (Government botanist and director of the Botanical Gardens Sydney). Publication Details: Sydney: W. A. Gullick, 1902-1925. Copyright Status: Public domain.

See also
 List of Eucalyptus species

References

odorata
Flora of South Australia
Mallees (habit)
Myrtales of Australia
Plants described in 1847
Taxa named by Hans Hermann Behr